High is a film released in 1967, directed by Larry Kent and starring Lanny Beckman, Astri Thorvik, Peter Mathews, Joyce Cay, and Denis Payne. Filmed in Montreal, it is likely most-remembered for being banned by the censors of Quebec immediately before its scheduled premiere at the Montreal International Film Festival for its use of drugs, nudity, and explicit sex scenes.

In defense, celebrities such as Jean Renoir, Fritz Lang, and even Warren Beatty came to High 's defense as a film of art, rather than gratuity.

Plot 
High is the story of a dope-dealing university dropout (Lanning Beckman) and his strait-laced girlfriend (Astri Thorvik) whom he corrupts and leads down a path of petty crime and uninhibited sex. Considered Larry Kent's best film, High is a tough-minded vision of the anarchic and violent underside of the 1960s culture of free love and ‘do-your-own-thing.’ The frank love making scenes and dope smoking led to a wide theatrical release in the U.S. and a ban by the censor boards in Ontario and British Columbia.

Cast
 Lanny Beckman	 as Tom (as Lanning Beckman)
 Astri Thorvik	as Vicky (as Astri Torvik)
 Peter Mathews		
 Joyce Cay		
 Denis Payne		
 Laurie Wynn Kent		
 Doris Cowan		
 Mortie Golub		
 Carol Epstein		
 Al Mayoff		
 Melinda McCracken		
 Gary Eisenkraft		
 Jack Esbein

Legacy
The film was screened at the 18th Berlin Film Festival in 1968 as part of Young Canadian Film, a lineup of films by emerging Canadian filmmakers. It was later screened at the 1984 Festival of Festivals as part of Front & Centre, a special retrospective program of artistically and culturally significant films from throughout the history of Canadian cinema.

It was part of a retrospective screening of Kent's films, alongside The Bitter Ash, Sweet Substitute and When Tomorrow Dies, which screened at a number of venues in 2002 and 2003, including Cinematheque Ontario in Toronto, the Pacific Cinémathèque in Vancouver and the Canadian Film Institute in Ottawa.

References

External links 
 

1967 films
Canadian drama films
Quebec films
Films shot in Montreal
English-language Canadian films
Films directed by Larry Kent
Canadian films about cannabis
1960s English-language films
1960s Canadian films